Religion in Italy is characterised by the predominance of Christianity and an increasing diversity of religious practices, beliefs and denominations. Most Christians in Italy adhere to the Catholic Church, whose headquarters are in Vatican City, Rome. Christianity has been present in the Italian Peninsula since the 1st century.

According to the 2012 Global Religious Landscape survey by the Pew Research Center (a think tank in the United States), 83.3% of the country's residents are Christians, 12.4% are irreligious, atheist or agnostic, 3.7% are Muslims and 0.6% adhere to other religions. Other sources give different accounts of Italy's Islamic population, usually around 2%. According to other sources, up to 10% of residents, both Italian citizens and foreign residents, profess a faith which is different from Catholicism. Among religious minorities, Islam is the largest, followed by Eastern Orthodoxy, Oriental Orthodoxy, Protestantism, Jehovah's Witnesses, Buddhism, Hinduism, Sikhism and Judaism.

According to the 2017 Being Christian in Western Europe survey by Pew, 58% of Italians consider religion to be very or somewhat important. Italy was the only country in the survey having more practising Christians than non-practising ones. Italy is the third European Union member in terms of highest weekly church attendance rates after Poland and Ireland. Italy's Catholic patron saints are Francis of Assisi and Catherine of Siena.

Overview
The 2012 Global Religious Landscape survey by the Pew Forum on Religion and Public Life (an American think tank) found that 83.3% of Italy's residents were Christians, 12.4% were irreligious, atheist or agnostic, 3.7% were Muslims and 0.6% adhered to other religions.

Regarding Italian citizens in Italy, according to the 2005 Eurobarometer poll (conducted on behalf of the European Commission), 74% of Italians "believe there is a God", 16% "believe there is some sort of spirit or life force" and 6% "do not believe there is any sort of spirit, God, or life force". According to a 2006 survey by Eurispes (an Italian research centre), Catholics made up 87.8% of Italian citizens, with 36.8% describing themselves as observants. According to the same poll in 2010, those percentages fell to 76.5% and 24.4%, respectively. In 2016 Eurispes found that 71.1% of Italians were Catholic, 5 points down from 2010, but their religious practice was on the rise at 25.4%. According to Doxa (another Italian research centre) in 2014, 75% of Italians are Catholic. In the spring of 2016 the Pew Research Center found that 81.7% of the population of Italy was affiliated with the Catholic Church, out of a Christian population of 85.1%; non-religious people comprised the 11.6% of the total population and were divided in atheists (3.1%), agnostics (2.5%) and "nothing in particular" (6.0%). According to a 2017 poll by Ipsos (a France-based research centre), 74.4% of Italians are Catholic (including 27.0% engaged and/or observant), 22.6% are irreligious and 3.0% adhere to other denominations in Italy. 
Finally, Eurostat's Eurobarometer survey in 2018 showed that 85.6% of Italy's population is Christian (78.9% Catholic, 4.6% orthodox Christians, 0.6% Protestants, 1.5% other Christians), while 2.6% belong to other religions and 11.7% are non-religious (7.5% atheists, 4.2% agnostics).

Additionally, there are significant differences in religious beliefs by gender, age and geography. For instance, according to a 2014 Doxa poll: 80% of women defined themselves as "Catholic", while 69% of men did so; 80% of the people in the age group above 55 defined themselves as Catholic, while 8% said to be irreligious or atheist and another 7% described themselves as "without religious reference"; among people aged between 15 and 34, percentages were 68%, 13% and 12%, respectively; in Southern Italy, 85%, 6% and 5%, respectively; in the North-West, 62%, 16% and 13%, respectively.

The Catholic Church

The headquarters of the 1.2-billion strong Catholic Church, the State of Vatican City (see also Holy See), is an enclave within the city of Rome and, thus, the Italian territory. The Church's world leader, the Pope, is the Bishop of Rome, hence the special relationship between Italians and the Church—and the latter's entanglement with Italian politics (see Lateran Treaty and the section below on religion and politics).

The current Pope is Francis, born Jorge Mario Bergoglio, who, before his election in 2013, is from Argentina and was the Archbishop of Buenos Aires from 1998 to his installation. Francis is the third non-Italian Pope in a row, after John Paul II (1978–2005) from Poland and Benedict XVI (2005–2013) from Germany.

Most of the leading Catholic religious orders, including the Jesuits, the Salesians, the Franciscans, the Capuchin Franciscans, the Benedectines, the Dominicans, the Divine Word Missionaries, the Redemptorists, the Conventual Franciscans and the Oblates of Mary Immaculate, have their headquarters in Rome too.

The Italian territory is divided into 225 Catholic dioceses (whose bishops have been organised, since 1952, in the politically influential Italian Episcopal Conference, CEI) and, according to Church statistics (which do not consider current active members), 96% of the country's population was baptised as Catholic.

Ecclesial life is somewhat vibrant and, despite secularization, some of the most active movements and associations are Catholic, including organisations as diverse as Catholic Action (AC), the Italian Catholic Association of Guides and Scouts (AGESCI), Communion and Liberation (CL), Neocatechumenal Way, the Focolare Movement, the Christian Associations of Italian Workers (ACLI), the Community of Sant'Egidio, etc., most of which have been involved in social activities and have frequently supplied Italian politics with their members.

Italy's current President, Sergio Mattarella, and former Prime Minister, Matteo Renzi, have been AC and AGESCI leaders, respectively, while the current President of the CEI, Cardinal Angelo Bagnasco, has been a long-time AGESCI assistant.

Minor historical denominations

Other than that the Latin-rite Catholic Church, Italy has two more native churches: the Italo-Albanian Catholic Church, one of the twenty-two Eastern Catholic Churches in communion with the Pope, and the Waldensian Evangelical Church, a Christian movement originated from Lyon in the late 12th century and adopted Calvinist theology shortly after the start of the Protestant Reformation (see also: Waldensians). The two churches include the majority of the population in Piana degli Albanesi, Sicily and Lungro, Calabria, and the so-called "Waldensian Valleys" (Val Pellice, Val Chisone and Valle Germanasca) of western Piedmont, respectively.

Most historical mainline Protestants, including the Waldensians (30,000 members), the Baptists (Baptist Evangelical Christian Union of Italy, 20,000), the mostly German-speaking Lutherans (Lutheran Evangelical Church in Italy, 7,000), the Methodists (Methodist Evangelical Church in Italy, 5,000) and minor Calvinist and Presbyterian communities, are affiliated to the Federation of Evangelical Churches in Italy, along with the Italian section of The Salvation Army and some minor Evangelical and Pentecostal denominations. In the Protestant context, it is also worth mentioning the Evangelical Christian Church of the Brethren (21,000) and the Italian section of the Seventh-day Adventist Church (20,000).

Italy is home to around 45,000 Jews, who are one of the most ancient Jewish communities in the world. Jewish presence dates to the pre-Christian Roman period and has continued uninterrupted up to the present, despite periods of extreme persecution and occasional expulsions from parts of the country. Native Italian Jews, who form the core of the community in Rome, practice the minhag Italkim, or "Italian Jews", but there are also Ashkenazi Jews who have settled in the North, especially in the lands of the former Republic of Venice (Veneto, Friuli-Venezia Giulia and eastern Lombardy) and Piedmont, since the late Middle Ages, and Sephardi Jews, who have established themselves mostly in Livorno, Florence, Venice and several cities of Emilia, after their expulsion from the Kingdom of Naples. The Jewish community of Milan, the country's second largest after Rome's, is the most international in character and composition, notably including a substantial number of Mizrahi Jews originating from Libya and the Middle East. The twenty-one Jewish local communities are affiliated with the Union of Italian Jewish Communities, which counts 25,000 members.

According to CESNUR, in 2017 in Italy there were about 3,200 adherents to pre-Christian, neo-pagan or neo-shamanic indigenous religions. Modern forms of native polytheism is represented by Roman Polytheistic Reconstructionism, which includes organizations such as Nova Roma, the Associazione Tradizionale Pietas, Communitas Populi Romani, the Movimento Tradizionale Romano, and the Societas Hesperiana pro Culto Deorum. There are also pagans belonging to other European religions, such as Heathenism, to which the Comunità Odinista and the Tempio del Lupo belong; Druidism, Hellenism and Wicca.

Immigration and future scenarios

Immigration has brought to Italy many religious minorities, especially Islam, Eastern Orthodoxy, and Oriental Orthodoxy. By the numbers, in 2015 the country was home to around 1,850,000 Muslims and virtually 1,700,000 Orthodox Christians. Among the latter, especially relevant are the Romanian Orthodox Church, which has a diocese of Italy, and the Greek Orthodox Church through the Ecumenical Patriarchate of Constantinople, whose Archdiocese of Italy and Exarchate of Southern Europe has its see in Venice. Massimo Introvigne, founder and director of CESNUR (an Italian think tank devoted to religious studies) and main author of L'enciclopedia delle religioni in Italia, predicts that, thanks to continued immigration from Eastern Europe, Orthodox Christians could soon become the country's second largest religious group, overtaking Muslims.

Also Protestantism, especially in its evangelical and Pentecostal forms, is on the rise: Introvigne recalls how Giorgio Bouchard, a Waldensian pastor, told him that "when he was born, the typical Italian Protestant was a man, lived in Piedmont, had a last name like Bouchard and was a Waldensian", while "today, the typical Italian Protestant believer is a woman, lives in Campania or Sicily, is named Esposito and is a Pentecostal." Not surprisingly the Assemblies of God in Italy (150,000 members), the Federation of Pentecostal Churches (50,000) and several smaller evangelical/Pentecostal denominations have the majority of their communities in the South. Additionally, several foreign-born churches, especially African initiated churches, mostly evangelical and/or Pentecostal, are taking roots in the country, especially in the North.

Among the fastest-growing new religious denominations in Italy a special place is held by the Jehovah's Witnesses (who count around 420,000 faithful, including both members and other people regularly attending the Congregation's meetings). Then come four faiths professed mainly by immigrants: Buddhists (260,000), Hindus (180,000), Sikhs (150,000), and Latter-day Saints (26,000). According to Caritas Italiana (the CEI's charitable arm), in 2015 the immigrant population was 53.8% Christian (30.5% Orthodox, 18.3% Catholic, 4.3% Protestant and 0.7% other), 32.2% Muslim, 2.9% Hindu and 2.2% Buddhist. According to the same source, in 2012 Italy was home to 850 "African Neo-Pentecostal churches", 750 foreign-language Catholic communities, 655 mosques or other Islamic houses of worship, 355 Orthodox parishes, 126 Buddhist temples, 37 Sikh ones and 2 Hindu ones.

Demography
The religious composition of the Italian population (2015 estimate: 60,795,612 people, including 55,782,575 Italian citizens and 5,014,037 foreign residents) is shown in the table below. The primary data source is the aforementioned CESNUR, which includes the data on foreign residents provided by Caritas Italiana.

Due to the lack of a single, coherent and statistically accurate source, the figures are to be taken with a grain of salt and sums do not necessarily add up. The number of Catholics among Italian citizens is calculated using the latest Eurispes poll, released in January 2016: according to the survey 71.1% of Italians are Catholic. The numbers of Christians are consequently calculated, including that number and the data provided by CESNUR and Caritas Italiana.

Religious denominations which have a relevant presence in the country, but for which there are no data, are included in the table.

Religious practice
Religious practice, especially church attendance, is still high in Italy when compared to the average Western European country.

The Italian National Institute of Statistics (ISTAT) found in 2015 that 29.0% of the population went to church, synagogue, mosque, temple or another house of worship on a weekly basis. The share of practising believers was higher in Southern Italy (33.5%) than the North-West (27.7%), the North-East (26.8%) and the Centre (25.0%). Religious practice was particularly high in Sicily (37.3%), in Campania (35.4%), Calabria (34.8%), Apulia (32.6%) and Molise (30.9%) in the South, in Veneto (32.4%)—once dubbed "white Veneto" because of Christian Democracy's strength there (white being the party's official colour)—and Trentino (31.4%) in the North-East, in Marche (31.6%) in the Centre. It was particularly low in Liguria (18.6%), Aosta Valley (21.0%), Friuli-Venezia Giulia (21.9%), and Sardinia (21.9%) and the so-called "red regions" (long-time strongholds of the left-wing/centre-left, from the Italian Communist Party to the current Democratic Party), especially Tuscany (19.4%) and Emilia-Romagna (21.6%).

Religion and politics

After Italian unification, predominantly supported by secular and anti-clerical forces, and especially the capture of Rome in 1870 which marked the final defeat of the Papal States by the Kingdom of Italy and gave start to the so-called Roman Question over the temporal power of the Pope, Catholics largely self-excluded themselves from active politics. As a result, all the main political parties and parliamentary groupings were secular in character until the early 20th century.

In 1905 the Italian Catholic Electoral Union was formed in order to coordinate the participation of Catholic voters in the Italian electoral contests. The party had minor but significant results and, under the so-called Gentiloni pact in 1913, it entered in alliance with the establishment Liberals.

After World War I, Catholics organised the Italian People's Party, as part of the Christian democracy movement.

During the Fascist regime, the Roman Question was settled through the Lateran Treaty, signed by the Holy See and the Kingdom of Italy in 1929. These gave birth to the State of Vatican City. Fascism persecuted religious minorities: on 9 April 1935, Guido Buffarini Guidi outlawed the Pentecostal faith, and during 1938-1939 Jews were targeted by the infamous racial laws and later victims of a genocide in the context of the Holocaust.

The Italian resistance movement saw the participation of Catholics, Protestants (Waldensians were especially active in the Action Party), and Jews (through the Jewish Brigade) alike. In 1943 a group of Catholics, including several former Populars and many members of Catholic Action (a widespread lay association), formed the aforementioned Christian Democracy party and, with Alcide De Gasperi, led the Italian provisional government since 1945.

After World War II, the Catholic Church, after some initial reservations (Pope Pius XII favoured a solution similar to that of the Church in Francoist Spain, while some cardinals wanted a plurality of Catholic parties, possibly including a communist one), actively supported De Gasperi's Christian Democracy, a Catholic-inspired but formally non-denominational party, and the so-called "political unity of Catholics". From 1946 to 1992 all Prime Ministers but two were Christian Democrats and Catholics.

However, both the Waldensians and the Jews have played an important role in Italian politics. While several Catholic-inspired parties also rose to political prominence after Christian Democracy's dissolution in 1994 (from Italian People's Party–1994 to Democracy is Freedom, from the Christian Democratic Centre to the Union of the Centre, from Forza Italia–1994 to Forza Italia–2013, Waldensians have usually been active in "secular" parties, especially the Italian Socialist Party, Italian Communist Party and, more recently, the Democratic Party, which is also home to former Christian Democrats. More recently, a group of conservative Pentecostals set up the Extended Christian Pact party. Also, the Jews have mostly been active in "secular" parties, but they have recently been more divided between the Democrats and Forza Italia.

Freedom of religion

The Constitution of Italy recognises the Catholic Church and the state as "independent and sovereign, each within its own sphere" (article 7), in respect of the liberal principle of separation of church and state. In particular, the Lateran Treaty of 1929 (signed under Benito Mussolini), which gave a special status to the Church, is recognised and modifications "accepted by both parties" to such treaty are allowed without the need of constitutional amendments. In fact, the treaty was later modified by a new agreement between the state and the Church in 1984 (under Prime Minister Bettino Craxi), according to which Catholicism ceased to be the state religion.

Freedom of religion is also recognised, with "all religious denominations" having "the right of self-organisation according to their own statutes, provided these do not conflict with Italian law"; "[t]heir relations with the state are regulated by law, based on agreements with their respective representatives" (article 8). Having an agreement with the Italian government is not needed in order to appoint chaplains in hospitals and jails and to be partially financed by taxpayers' money. Since 1984, the Italian government has signed thirteen such agreements and eleven have been approved by the Italian Parliament and signed into law, including the following:
Union of Methodist and Waldensian Churches ;
Evangelical Christian Churches Assemblies of God in Italy ;
Italian Union of Seventh-day Adventist Christian Churches ;
Union of Jewish Communities in Italy ;
Baptist Evangelical Christian Union of Italy ;
Lutheran Evangelical Church in Italy ;
Holy Orthodox Archdiocese of Italy and Exarchate of Southern Europe ;
The Church of Jesus Christ of Latter-day Saints in Italy ;
Apostolic Church in Italy ;
Italian Buddhist Union ;
Italian Hindu Union ;
Soka Gakkai Italian Buddhist Institute .

Additionally, there is one agreement endorsed by the government, but not yet signed into law:
Christian Congregation of Jehovah's Witnesses in Italy .

Under the eight per thousand system, Italian taxpayers can choose to whom devolve a compulsory "Eight per thousand tax" of 0.8% from their annual income tax return between an organised religion recognised by Italy or, alternatively, to a social assistance scheme run by the government. In the latest available year (2012), 15,226,291 taxpayers chose the Catholic Church, 562,313 the Union of Methodist and Waldensian Churches, 72,238 the Union of Jewish Communities in Italy, 47,859 the Lutheran Evangelical Church in Italy, 44,229 the Evangelical Christian Churches Assemblies of God in Italy, and 29,448 the Italian Union of Seventh-day Adventist Christian Churches. The "Eight per thousand tax" has thus disproportionately helped some minor denominations, particularly the Waldensians.

See also

Christianity in Italy
Catholicism in Italy
Eastern Orthodoxy in Italy
Oriental Orthodoxy in Italy
Protestantism in Italy
Islam in Italy
Judaism in Italy
Baháʼí Faith in Italy
Buddhism in Italy
Hinduism in Italy
Sikhism in Italy
Irreligion in Italy
List of Italian religious minority politicians

References

Bibliography